Hermann Scherenberg (20 January 1826, Swinemünde - 21 August 1897, Berlin) was a German painter, illustrator and caricaturist.

Biography
According to Theodor Fontane, who knew the Scherenbergs and wrote about them in his autobiography, the family originally came from Westphalia and his father, Johann Friedrich Scherenberg, lived in the Huguenot colony in Swinemünde. Hermann was born to Johann's second wife. His older half-brother was the poet, . He was also related to the poet and journalist, .

From 1846 to 1847, he studied painting at the Kunstakademie Düsseldorf, under the tutelage of Theodor Hildebrandt.

For many years, he was an employee of the Illustrirte Zeitung, providing hundreds of illustrations. He drew portraits of prominent personalities and major events from Prussian and German history as well as scenes from everyday life.

He had one son, Hans, who apparently also became a painter, although no further information is available.

The gravesite has not been preserved.

Selected works

References

External links 

 Deutsche Bilderbogen
 Three Anti-clerical caricatures from Ulk
 Hermann Scherenberg in HeidICON, Illustrations from the Fliegende Blätter

1826 births
1897 deaths
19th-century German painters
19th-century German male artists
German illustrators
German caricaturists
Kunstakademie Düsseldorf alumni
People from Świnoujście